The Kingdom of Holland ( (contemporary),  (modern)) was created by Napoleon Bonaparte, overthrowing the Batavian Republic in March 1806 in order to better control the Netherlands. Since becoming Emperor in 1804, Napoleon sought to extirpate republican tendencies in territories France controlled, and placed his third brother, Louis Bonaparte, on the throne of the puppet kingdom. The name of the leading province, Holland, now designated the whole country. In 1807, East Frisia and Jever were added to the kingdom.

In 1809, after the Walcheren Campaign, Holland had to surrender all territories south of the river Rhine to France. Also in 1809, Dutch forces fighting on the French side participated in defeating the anti-Bonapartist German rebellion led by Ferdinand von Schill, at the battle of Stralsund.

King Louis did not perform to Napoleon's expectations – he tried to serve Dutch interests instead of his brother's – and the kingdom was dissolved in 1810, after which the Netherlands were annexed by France until 1813. Holland covered the area of the present-day Netherlands, with the exception of Limburg, and parts of Zeeland, which were French territory, and with the addition of East Frisia. It was the first formal monarchy in the Netherlands since 1581.

The long range result of the country having been a monarchy was to facilitate the ability of the House of Orange to assume, after Napoleon's fall, the status of full-fledged Monarchs – ending their centuries-long ambiguous status as Stadholders, which had been the source of unending instability and conflict throughout the history of the Dutch Republic.

Coat of arms 
Napoléon's brother Louis Bonaparte was installed as King of Holland on 5 June 1806. Originally the arms of the new kingdom were to be like those of the Kingdom of Italy: an eagle bearing a shield, with the arms of the United Netherlands, the lion, now royally crowned. In December 1806, in Paris, A. Renodi designed arms quartering the Napoléonic eagle with the lion of the United Netherlands. Around the shield was the French Order of the Grand Aigle. Behind the shield are crossed sceptres, typical for Napoleonic heraldry, and above the shield, Napoleon's star.

A few months later, on 20 May 1807, King Louis – now called "Lodewijk" – altered these arms, adding a helmet, leaving out his brother's star, and replacing the Grand Aigle with his own Dutch Order of the Union and the old Dutch devise "Unity makes strength" around the shield. Exemplary for the innovation in Napoleon's heraldry are the two hands coming out of clouds from behind the shield holding swords, designating King Louis as Connétable de France.

History 

Napoléon felt the Batavian Republic was becoming too independent for his liking. He thus forced the Dutch to accept his brother, Louis Bonaparte, as king. The alternative would have been outright annexation to France. Despite these circumstances, many citizens were very happy with his arrival. But there was also opposition, because many feared the new King would introduce the dreaded policy of conscription. However, the new king did not implement the policy, despite the ire of Napoléon, who demanded that King Louis raise a large army to guard the North from possible British incursions, and to aid the French armies in Germany and Spain.

Apart from the lavishly uniformed Royal Guard, the army of the Kingdom of Holland would always be short of recruits, leading to units being disbanded or amalgamated. Acts to recruit more troops, for instance by raising a Jewish regiment or by adding all male orphans to the army as Velites, were of little effect, the latter leading to public riots and accusations of introducing the conscription.

Napoléon intended for Louis to be little more than the prefect of Holland. For example, the ministers were provided mostly by Napoléon. However, Louis had his own mind, and was determined to be as independent of his elder brother as possible. In addition to refusing to introduce conscription, he made a sincere effort to learn the Dutch language, even going as far as to adopt the Dutch spelling of his name, Lodewijk. He declared himself Dutch rather than French and demanded that his ministers renounce their French citizenships as well. He also required his ministers and court to only speak Dutch.

Due to the economic blockade enforced by Napoléon, the economy of the Kingdom of Holland was further depressed; and many Dutch citizens turned to getting goods from smugglers. Louis hesitated to oppose this, which led Napoléon to sending units of Douanes Imperiales to Holland.

After British troops launched an ill-fated invasion of Walcheren in the Walcheren Campaign of 1809, Napoléon lost patience with his hesitant brother and decided to make Holland an integral part of France. After annexing the southern provinces of Holland into the Empire, he forced King Louis to abdicate in 1810. Louis's son, Napoléon Louis Bonaparte, reigned for a week as Louis II before Napoléon annexed the rest of the kingdom into the French Empire. During that period Queen Hortense acted as Regent of the Kingdom.

The Napoleonic Kingdom of Holland was short-lived, but in the aftermath of Napoléon's fall, the precedent of the Netherlands having been a Kingdom facilitated the House of Orange's successful efforts to upgrade themselves from the rank of stadhouder to being fully-fledged monarchs.

Footnotes

References

Bibliography

External links 
 
 History of the Kingdom of Nederlands at royal-house.nl

 
1800s establishments in the Netherlands
1806 establishments in Europe
1806 in the Netherlands
1810 disestablishments in Europe
1810 in the Netherlands
19th century in the Netherlands
Client states of the Napoleonic Wars
Former kingdoms
Former monarchies of Europe
Former polities in the Netherlands
States and territories disestablished in 1810
States and territories established in 1806
Patriottentijd